Hopes and Fears is a 2004 album by Keane.

Hopes and Fears may also refer to:

 Hopes and Fears Tour, a tour by Keane in support of the above album
 Hopes and Fears (Art Bears album), 1978
 "Hopes & Fears", a 2009 song by Will Young

See also
 "Hope and Fear", an episode of the television series Star Trek: Voyager